The Leica M9 is a full-frame digital rangefinder camera from Leica Camera AG. It was introduced in September 2009. It uses an 18.5-megapixel Kodak image sensor, and is compatible with almost all M mount lenses.

Features
The M9 uses an 18.5-megapixel Kodak (KAF-18500) CCD image sensor that was developed specifically for the camera.
The M9 supports most M-mount lenses—with only a few older models not suitable due to protruding elements of the lens into the camera body.

Reception
The M9 was introduced by Leica on 9 September 2009, in New York City. The launch (which also introduced the Leica X1 and Leica S2 models) included a live video webcast, and featured a guest appearance by the musician Seal.

In 2011, Leica verified a malfunction that may prevent the camera from saving images to certain SanDisk cards and issued a firmware update in July 2012, that made "further improvements of SD-Card compatibility".

Leica M9 Titanium
In 2010, Leica released the Leica M9 Titanium camera body (a variant of the M9), which was designed by Walter de Silva. The body and supplied lens (a Summilux-M 35mm f/1.4 ASPH FLE) are both built from solid titanium.

Leica M9-P
The Leica M9-P camera body was announced in 2011; it was not intended as a replacement for the M9, however, as the two camera bodies were sold concurrently. Leica added a scratch-resistant sapphire LCD cover on the M9-P, and the steel grey paint option was replaced with a classic chrome cover. The black paint option is still available. The M9-P also replaces the body covering with vulcanite, as used on earlier M cameras. Leica removed the red circular logo on the front of the camera (as found on the M9), and replaced it with the company's name etched on the top of the M9-P.

Leica M-E

The Leica M-E camera body was announced in September 2012. It is similar to the M9 and M9-P cameras, but is missing the frame-line selection lever (a mechanism which allows the photographer to assess the field of view of lenses with different focal lengths without having to mount them), and the USB port. This is the cheapest model in the Leica M range.

Gallery

References

External links
  (for the Leica M)
 Review, sample photos and manual for Leica M9, Leica M-E and Leica M9-P by Thorsten Overgaard

M9
Digital rangefinder cameras
Cameras introduced in 2009